The Annibal class was a class of two 74-gun ships of the French Navy. The type was one of the first achievements of Jacques-Noël Sané. His first design - on 24 November 1777 - was for a ship of 166 pieds (176 feet 11 inches) length, but he produced an amended design on 10 January 1779 for the Annibal, and a further amended design on 3 March 1780 for her near-sister Northumberland. Both ships were captured during the Fourth Battle of Ushant ("Bataille du 13 prairial an II" or "Glorious First of June") on 1 June 1794 off Ushant, and were added to but never commissioned into the British Navy.

 
Builder: Brest Dockyard
Ordered: 20 February 1778
Launched: 5 October 1778
Fate: Captured by the Royal Navy on 1 June 1794 and renamed HMS Achille, but broken up at Plymouth in February 1796.

 
Builder:  Brest Dockyard
Ordered: 
Launched: 3 May 1780
Fate: Captured by the Royal Navy on 1 June 1794 and named HMS Northumberland, but broken up at Plymouth in November 1795.

References

Winfield, Rif and Roberts, Stephen S. (2017) French Warships in the Age of Sail 1626–1786: Design, Construction, Careers and Fates.. Seaforth Publishing. .
Winfield, Rif and Roberts, Stephen S. (2015) French Warships in the Age of Sail 1786-1861: Design, Construction, Careers and Fates. Seaforth Publishing. .

74-gun ship of the line classes
Ship of the line classes from France
 
Ship classes of the French Navy